Anorostoma is a genus of flies in the family Heleomyzidae. There are about 17 described species in Anorostoma.

Species
These 17 species belong to the genus Anorostoma:

A. alternans Garrett, 1925 i c g b
A. carbona Curran, 1933 i c g
A. chiloensis Brèthes, 1924 c g
A. cinereum Curran, 1932 i c g b
A. coloradense Garrett, 1924 i c g
A. currani Garrett, 1922 i c g
A. fumipenne Gill, 1962 i c g
A. grande Darlington, 1908 i c g
A. hinei Garrett, 1925 i c g
A. jamesi Gill, 1962 i c g
A. jersei Garrett, 1924 i c g
A. longipile Gill, 1962 i c g
A. lutescens Curran, 1933 i c g
A. maculatum Darlington, 1908 i c g b
A. marginatum Loew, 1862 i c g
A. opacum Coquillett, 1901 i c g
A. wilcoxi Curran, 1933 i c g

Data sources: i = ITIS, c = Catalogue of Life, g = GBIF, b = Bugguide.net

References

Further reading

 

Heleomyzidae
Articles created by Qbugbot
Sphaeroceroidea genera